Christian Titz (born 1 April 1971) is a German professional football manager and former player who is the manager of 1. FC Magdeburg. Besides coaching, Titz has published several specialised books on football training methods.

During his active career, he most notably played for 2. Bundesliga for SV Waldhof Mannheim in the mid-1990s before ending his playing career in the Regionalliga for SC Idar-Oberstein in 2000. He then embarked on a coaching career, managing the youth teams of several clubs between 2000 and 2006 and again 2009, as well as amateur clubs while at the same time working for the United States Soccer Federation. From 2011 to 2014, Titz coached FC 08 Homburg in the Regionalliga Südwest before joining Hamburger SV in 2015, initially taking over the U17-team and later the reserve team. From 13 March 2018, he was head coach of the Hamburger SV first team before being dismissed on 23 September 2018. Prior to the 2019–20 season he joined Regionalliga club Rot-Weiss Essen but was dismissed after one season after failing to reach play-off promotions.

Playing career
Titz started playing for local club FC Viktoria Neckarhausen, and later SV Sandhausen as a junior player. He began his senior career at his first club, Viktoria Neckarhausen, and would later go on to play for SG Egelsbach and SV Waldhof Mannheim before finishing his career at SC Idar-Oberstein, for whom he made six appearances during the 1999–2000 season in the third tier Regionalliga West/Südwest.

Managerial career

Beginnings
Upon his retirement as an active player, Titz was appointed as coach of the Alemannia Aachen U19-team prior to the 2000–01 season. He worked as a coach in Aachen for four years, and acquired his professional coaching license in December 2004. In November 2005, he was appointed as head coach of fifth tier Bayernliga side 1. FC Passau, but could not save the club from relegation to the Landesliga Bayern and was sacked in August 2006. Titz then started a scouting network in Europe for the United States Soccer Federation.

For the 2000–01 season, Titz took over the first team as well as the U19 team of SCB Viktoria Köln, playing in the fifth tier Mittelrheinliga and the Under 19 Bundesliga, respectively. He was released from his duties at the end of December 2009.

Titz was then appointed as head coach of fifth tier Oberliga Rheinland-Pfalz/Saar team FC 08 Homburg ahead of the 2011–12 season, leading them to the division championship and promotion to the fourth tier Regionalliga. In the subsequent seasons, 2012–13 (14th) and 2013–14 (11th), he was able to establish the team in the division. In April 2014, Titz left the club.

Hamburger SV
Starting from the 2015–16 season, Titz was put in charge of the U17-side of Hamburger SV playing in the B-Junioren Bundesliga (Under 17 Bundesliga) for two seasons. For the 2017–18 season, he took over the fourth tier Regionalliga Nord reserve team, Hamburger SV II. Gaining 40 points from 17 games, the reserves became autumn Herbstmeister.

On 13 March 2018, Titz left the reserves after leading them to first place in the table with 45 points from 20 matches, and took over Bernd Hollerbach's first team, struggling in the bottom-end of the Bundesliga with seven points behind in the relegation battle. He initially signed a contract until the end of the 2017–18 season. After gaining ten points from seven games, HSV under Titz were able to reduce the gap to the relegation place before the last matchday to two points. Despite a win on the last match day, HSV suffered relegation from the Bundesliga for the first time in its history on 12 May 2018. Before the last matchday, him and the club had agreed on a contract extension, keeping him at the club independent of the team's ability to stay in the Bundesliga. Due to a positive change in performance, style of play, and the infusion of younger players such as Tatsuya Ito and Matti Steinmann, who had started the season in the reserves, Titz received praise.

On 16 May 2018, Titz signed a contract with HSV, keeping him at the club until 2020. The team would go on to lose their opening game 3–0 at home in the 2. Bundesliga matchup against Holstein Kiel. After four out of the next four matches, HSV were first in the league table. Afterwards, they lost 5–0 at home to SSV Jahn Regensburg, which tied their biggest home loss in club history (equalled 5–0 to Bayern Munich in 1974, to Saint-Étienne in 1980 and again to Bayern Munich in 2014). The following four games only resulted in one win and three goalless draws, including in the Hamburger Stadtderby against FC St. Pauli. On 23 October 2018, Titz was sacked, leaving the club at 5th place in the league table, two points behind first place. He was replaced by Hannes Wolf. Director of football Ralf Becker stated afterwards, that the HSV directors had come to the conclusion that the team went in the wrong direction with regards to development, which had meant an increased risk of missing the season goals.

Rot-Weiss Essen
Ahead of the 2019–20 season, Titz took over as head coach of fourth tier Regionalliga club Rot-Weiss Essen as the successor to Karsten Neitzel, who had been released from his duties after an 8th place finish in the previous season. Titz signed a contract keeping him at the club until 2021. Essen ended the season prematurely in June, after the Regionalliga was cancelled due to effects of the COVID-19 pandemic. They finished third in the table and thus missed the goal of participation in promotion play-offs for the 3. Liga; something club management had initially aimed for. As a result, the contract, which was still valid for one year, was terminated at the end of the season.

1. FC Magdeburg
Titz was appointed as new head coach of 1. FC Magdeburg on 12 February 2021. Titz started with three defeats, which were followed by a series of eleven unbeaten games, nine of which were won. As a result of this high-flying run, the team was able to stay in the class on the third-last matchday. In the 2021/22 season, the team confirmed its good form and crystallized as the favorite early on. From the 7th to the 38th matchday, FCM occupied first place in the league. Already on the 35th matchday, the championship and thus the promotion to the 2nd Bundesliga was certain. The season was finally concluded with 78 points and a 14-point lead over second-place Eintracht Braunschweig. The promotion automatically extended his contract.

Outside football
Titz is a trained administrative assistant and state-certified business economist. He is the owner of the service provider Coaching Zone, which was founded by Thomas Dooley under the name Dooley Soccer University and offers, among other things, individual training. Customers included Lewis Holtby and Christoph Moritz. Together with Dooley, Titz has published several specialised publication, focusing on several aspects of football.

Managerial statistics

Bibliography

References

External links

1971 births
Living people
Footballers from Mannheim
German footballers
Association football midfielders
SV Sandhausen players
SV Waldhof Mannheim players
2. Bundesliga players
Oberliga (football) players
German football managers
Bundesliga managers
2. Bundesliga managers
FC 08 Homburg managers
Hamburger SV managers
Rot-Weiss Essen managers
1. FC Magdeburg managers